Highland Park Historic District is a national historic district located at Wheeling, Ohio County, West Virginia. The residential district includes 12 contributing buildings in the Highland Park subdivision. The houses were built on 18 lots carved from the former farm of Oliver Pryor between 1899 and 1939, and are representative of popular architectural styles during that period.  The district includes the original farmhouse, known as the Pryor-Wilson House, built about 1852 with additions and modifications through 1922.  The district boundaries encompass an area that once included a stone entrance and two homes designed by noted Wheeling architect Frederick F. Faris (1870-1927). The residents of Highland Park were prominent in the areas of steel, insurance, law, hardware, real estate, and banking.

It was listed on the National Register of Historic Places in 1993.

References

Houses in Wheeling, West Virginia
Historic districts in Wheeling, West Virginia
National Register of Historic Places in Wheeling, West Virginia
Houses on the National Register of Historic Places in West Virginia
Historic districts on the National Register of Historic Places in West Virginia
1993 establishments in West Virginia